The 2023 Summit League women's basketball Tournament was the postseason women's basketball tournament for the Summit League for the 2022-23 season. All tournament games were played at the Denny Sanford Premier Center in Sioux Falls, South Dakota, from March 3-7, 2023.

Seeds
All ten conference teams participated in the tournament following a change announced before the season began. It was the final year that St. Thomas participated in a Division I conference tournament in any sport. Teams were seeded by regular-season conference record, with a tiebreaker system to seed teams with identical conference records. The tiebreakers operated in the following order:
 Head-to-head record
 Record against the top-seeded team not involved in the tie, going down through the standings until the tie is broken

Schedule and results

Bracket

Source:

All-Tournament Team
The following players were named to the All-Tournament team:

References

2022–23 Summit League women's basketball season
Summit League women's basketball tournament